The following is a list of towns in England and Wales which formed urban districts under the Local Government Act 1894 in the years following its introduction. For districts formed when the act came into force see: Urban districts formed in England and Wales 1894–95.Note for table: 'UD' stands for Urban District, 'RD' stands for Rural District, 'MB' stands for Municipal Borough and 'CB' stands for County Borough.

1896-99
In the period 1896-99 sixty urban districts were formed and twenty-two abolished, a net increase of 38, bringing the total number of urban districts to 813.

1900-09
In the 1900s forty-six urban districts were formed and forty-one abolished, a net increase of 5, bringing the total number of urban districts to an all-time high of 818.

1910-19
In the 1910s twenty-one urban districts were formed and forty-one abolished, a net decrease of 20, bringing the total number of urban districts to 798.

1920-29
In the 1920s twenty-five urban districts were formed and thirty-nine abolished, a net decrease of 14, bringing the total number of urban districts to 784.

1930-39
In the 1930s forty-one urban districts were formed and two hundred fifty-three abolished, a net decrease of 212, bringing the total number of urban districts to 572. This was largely due to the County review orders instigated by the Local Government Act 1929.

1940-74
From 1940 until their abolition in 1974, there were only six more urban districts formed and a further fifty-six abolished, a net decrease of 50, bringing the total number of urban districts to 522.

Sources

Districts abolished by the London Government Act 1963
Districts of England abolished by the Local Government Act 1972
 
Districts of Wales abolished by the Local Government Act 1972
Districts of Wales created by the Local Government Act 1894
England geography-related lists
Former subdivisions of England
Local government in the United Kingdom
 
 
Urban districts of the United Kingdom
Wales geography-related lists
England